The 1968 Ballon d'Or,  given to the best football player in Europe as judged by a panel of sports journalists from UEFA member countries, was awarded to George Best on 24 December 1968.

Best was the first Northern Irish national to win the award. He was the third Manchester United player to win the trophy after Denis Law (1964) and Bobby Charlton (1966).

Rankings

References

External links
 France Football Official Ballon d'Or page

1968
1968–69 in European football